Eucalyptus pachyloma, commonly known as Kalgan Plains mallee, is a species of mallee that is native to Western Australia. It has smooth, greyish bark, lance-shaped adult leaves, flower buds in groups of between seven and thirteen, white to cream-coloured flowers and conical to cup-shaped fruit.

Description
The concolorous, glossy, green adult leaves are erect and alternately arranged. It blooms between October and March producing white to cream coloured flowers. Each axillary unbranched inflorescence has umbels containing seven to thirteen buds. The single operculum has a conical to rounded with irregularly flexed stamens.

Taxonomy
Eucalyptus pachyloma was first formally described by the botanist George Bentham in 1867 in Flora Australiensis. The specific epithet is taken from the Greek word pachy meaning thick and loma meaning border in reference to the thick rim of the fruit of the plant.

This species is part of the Eucalyptus subgenus series Diversiformae, a group of mallees that all have adult leaves held erect, buds with a single unscarred operculum and pyramidal seeds. The other species in series this series include E. erectifolia, E. platydisca, E. diversifolia, E. todtiana, E. lateritica, E. dolorosa and E. buprestium.

Distribution
Kalgan Plains mallee is found on sandplains and foothills growing in sandy soils in the southern Wheatbelt and Great Southern regions of Western Australia extending from around Pingelly in the north through to Albany in the south.

Conservation status
This eucalypt is classified as "not threatened" by the Western Australian Government Department of Parks and Wildlife.

See also
List of Eucalyptus species

References

Eucalypts of Western Australia
pachyloma
Myrtales of Australia
Plants described in 1867
Taxa named by George Bentham